MPQ may refer to

 Marvel Puzzle Quest
 Max Planck Institute of Quantum Optics
 MPQ (file format)
 Multidimensional Personality Questionnaire